Adi Lalaciwa was a Fijian chiefess and member of the Vuanirewa dynasty on the Lau Islands of Fiji.

Lalaciwa was the only daughter of Rasolo, who was the third Roko Sau, first Tu'i Nayau and the progenitor of the Matailakeba and Vatuwaqa households.

Lalaciwa was sister of Soroaqali and half-sister of Roko Malani and Taliai Tupou.

References

Fijian chiefesses
People from Lakeba
Vuanirewa